Rockinghamia is a plant genus of the spurge family (Euphorbiaceae), first described as a genus in 1966. The entire genus is endemic to the State of Queensland in Australia.

Species
 Rockinghamia angustifolia (Benth.) Airy Shaw
 Rockinghamia brevipes Airy Shaw

References

Acalypheae
Euphorbiaceae genera
Flora of Queensland
Endemic flora of Australia